Exosoma lusitanicum or daffodil leaf beetle is a species of skeletonizing leaf beetles belonging to the family Chrysomelidae, subfamily Galerucinae.

Etymology
The genus Exosoma is derived from the ancient Greek ἕξω, meaning outside and σῶμα, meaning body. The Latin species name lusitanicus, meaning occurring in Lusitania (Portugal), refers to the area of distribution of this species.

Distribution
This quite common species is found in France, Italy, Spain, Portugal, North Africa (Morocco, Algeria, Tunisia) and in the Near East.

Habitat
These beetles occur in warm-dry areas, both in the plains as well as at an elevation of a thousand meters.

Description

These small beetles have an elongated, oval and glabrous body. Its pronotum is very finely punctured, convex, and wider than long. Elytra are tight and finely punctured. The basic colour of the pronotum and elytra is shiny red-orange. The head, the antennae, the legs and the abdomen are black.

This species is similar to Exososoma theryi.

Biology
Larvae feed on bulbs of Amaryllidaceae (for instance Narcissus tazetta) and Liliaceae species, while adults feed on flowers of several wild plants, mainly Asteraceae species and are potentially dangerous for vineyards.

References

External links
 Borowiec L.: Culex.biol.uni.wroc.pl Chrysomelidae of Europe
 Asturnatura

Galerucinae
Beetles of Europe
Beetles described in 1767
Taxa named by Carl Linnaeus